Todavía is a studio album by Italian singer Mina, released on 21 September 2007 by PDU. The album features 13 songs in Spanish and one in Portuguese, and includes seven duets with Latin-American, Spanish and Italian stars.

Track listing

Personnel

Charts

Weekly charts

Year-end charts

Certifications and sales

References 

2007 albums
Mina (Italian singer) albums
Vocal duet albums
Spanish-language albums